Siccia overlaeti is a moth in the family Erebidae. It was described by Lars Kühne in 2007. It is found in the Democratic Republic of the Congo.

References

Moths described in 2007
Nudariina
Endemic fauna of the Democratic Republic of the Congo